Ngola might refer to:
 Ngola (ruler), the rulers of the medieval African state of Ndongo
 Ngola (language), a language of Angola.